Mr.Mr. is the fourth extended play (EP) by South Korean girl group Girls' Generation. The EP consists of six tracks and it incorporates electropop and R&B-pop music genres. It was released for digital download by SM Entertainment and KT Music on February 24, 2014. The CD and digital version were released in Hong Kong on the same day, and was made available for purchase on February 27 in South Korea. To promote the album, Girls' Generation appeared on several South Korean music programs including Music Bank and Inkigayo. The title track was released as a single. This is the final Korean EP featuring member Jessica who later left the group on September 30, 2014.

Mr.Mr. received mostly positive reviews from music criticsAllMusic's Heather Phares praised the album as showcasing the group's musical strengths, while Billboard'''s Jeff Benjamin positively viewed the EP as a more "impressive" release compared to the group's previous album I Got a Boy (2013). The EP peaked atop the Gaon Album Chart and became the best-selling album by a girl group of 2014 in South Korea, as well as the fifth best-selling album overall. It also entered the Japanese Oricon chart at number 11.

 Songs Mr.Mr. is composed of six songs, which feature "dazzling" electropop and R&B-pop genres. According to member Seohyun, the EP incorporates "exciting" R&B sounds with "cool, simple" melodies. The opening track, "Mr.Mr.", was composed by The Underdogs, who have worked with several American recording artists such as Beyoncé, Justin Timberlake, and Britney Spears. It has been described as an R&B-pop song infused with electropop. It also incorporates a hip hop beat and EDM-inspired buildups. The second song, "Goodbye," is a pop-rock track that is instrumented by snare drums and hi-hats. "Europa", meanwhile, draws from retro late-1980s Europop and disco-pop genres.

"Wait a Minute" was described as a "bouncy" jazz-pop track with "beautiful [harmonizations]", and "Back Hug" features a "simple, snappy" R&B production. The EP concludes with "Soul"an uptempo Korean version of the group's first original Chinese recording, "Find Your Soul", released in 2013. The original version was used as the theme song on commercials for the Korean MMORPG video game, Blade & Soul, in Chinese-language markets across Asia.

Release and promotionMr.Mr. was released for digital download worldwide on February 24, 2014, under SM Entertainment and KT Music, while the physical version was made available in South Korea on February 27, 2014, by the same labels. The title track served as the EP's lead single and it was released to South Korean mainstream radio on February 25, 2014.

To promote the EP, Girls' Generation appeared on several South Korean music programs, the first being Mnet's M Countdown, where they performed "Mr.Mr." and "Wait a Minute" live on March 6, 2014. The group also appeared on KBS's Music Bank, MBC's Show! Music Core and SBS's Inkigayo on March 7, 8 and 9, 2014, respectively. On Show! Music Core, the group performed "Mr.Mr." and "Wait a Minute", while on Music Bank, they performed the title track and "Back Hug".

Reception

Upon its release, Mr.Mr received mostly positive reviews from music critics. Heather Phares from AllMusic labelled the EP "a set of songs that offers something for every kind of Girls' Generation and expands their musical reach." Phares further praised the EP for helping the group to be an outstanding case of Korean popular music. Writing for Billboard, Jeff Benjamin named the six songs of the EP "strong" and called it a more "impressive effort" compared to the group's 2013 album I Got a Boy. He also deemed the track list "a tight bundle of songs that still see the group dipping and experimenting into new sonic territory, but possibly more focused than ever." Benjamin also wrote an article for Fuse, on which he complimented the album's musical styles as "short, sweet, but strong." Music critics from webzine Weiv praised the concepts and musical styles of Mr.Mr; critic Subtlety said that all of its musical styles are evenly distributed, and felt that it did a good job of showcasing the 'third path of idols' by not only embracing sexy or cute, but rather both. On the other hand, Kim Do-heon from online magazine IZM compared the EP to the group's 2011 album The Boys for its "balance of musical competence and appeal to mass popularity", but found the songs to be inadequate. He concluded that the group needed to "[set] a clear direction for the future" after the "mistake" of I Got a Boy, and Mr.Mr was not the answer.

Commercial performanceMr.Mr. was a commercial success domestically. It claimed the top spot on the South Korean Gaon Album Chart on the chart issue dated February 23March 1, 2014. It remained on the peak position for one further week, beating 2NE1's Crush. Mr.Mr. came second on the Gaon Monthly Album Chart of February, selling 87,824 physical copies, only behind B.A.P's First Sensibility, which sold over 91,000 units. The following month, it topped the Gaon Monthly Album Chart with sales of 70,295 copies. It was placed at number 47 on the Gaon Monthly Album Chart of April with a further 1,125 units sold. Overall, Mr.Mr. was the fifth highest-selling physical album and the best-selling album by a girl group of 2014 in South Korea with total sales figures of 163,209 copies.Mr.Mr. debuted at number 110 on the US Billboard 200 chart, selling 3,000 copies in its first week. By doing so, the EP became Girls' Generation's highest-charting release on the Billboard 200 following subgroup TTS's Twinkle, which charted at number 126 in 2012. Mr.Mr. also peaked at number three on the World Albums, and number 23 on the Independent Albums charts. In Japan, it peaked at number eleven on the Oricon Albums Chart.

The six songs from the EP debuted on the South Korean Gaon Digital Chart: "Mr.Mr." (number one), "Goodbye" (number ten), "Wait a Minute" (number 18), "Back Hug" (number 24), "Europa" (number 25), and "Soul" (number 33).

Track listing
Credits adapted from Mr.Mr. liner notes

Personnel
Credits are adapted from Mr.Mr.'' liner notes

Lee Soo-manproducer
Tom Coynemastering engineer
Steven Myungkyu LeeEnglish supervisor
Taeyeonvocals, background vocals 
Jessicavocals, background vocals 
Sunnyvocals, background vocals 
Tiffanyvocals, background vocals 
Hyoyeonvocals
Yurivocals
Sooyoungvocals, background vocals 
Yoonavocals
Seohyunvocals, background vocals 
Kenzievocal director , director , keyboard 
Ylva Dimbergbackground vocals 
Yang Geun-youngbackground vocals 
Gu Jong-pilrecording engineer , mixing engineer , additional bass arrangement 
Lee Min-gyuadditional vocal editing 
Lee Joo-hyungvocal director , Pro Tools operator , additional vocal editing , director , background vocals 
Choi Young-kyungbackground vocals 
Jung Ui-seokrecording engineer , mixing engineer 
Kim Jeong-baeguitar 
Jung Eun-kyungadditional vocal editing 
Choi Hoonbass guitar 
Jung Soo-wanguitar 
Yoo Ji-sangkeyboard 
Hwang Sung-jaedirector , bass guitar , Pro Tools operator 
Seo Mi-raebackground vocals , additional vocal editing 
Lee Sung-ryulguitar 
Lee Na-ilstrings arrangement and conductor 
Nickelstrings arrangement and conductor , Pro Tools operator 
Yoongstrings 
Jung Soo-minPro Tools operator 
Lee Sung-horecording engineer 
Oh Sung-geunrecording engineer 
Son Joo-yongassistant recording engineer 
Nam Goong-jinmixing engineer 
Red Rocketdirector , keyboard , additional vocal editing 
Ryu Hyun-wooguitar 
Kang Hae-gurecording engineer 
Kim Young-minexecutive supervisor

Charts

Weekly charts

Year-end charts

Release history

References

2014 EPs
Electropop EPs
Girls' Generation albums
SM Entertainment EPs
Genie Music EPs
Korean-language EPs